Hong Kong (Area Control Centre)  is one of two key area control centres in the Pearl River Delta and is under the Hong Kong Civil Aviation Department. HK ACC is based out of the control tower at Hong Kong International Airport.

From this ACC, air traffic controllers provide en route and terminal control services to aircraft in the Hong Kong Flight Information Region (FIR). The Hong Kong FIR airspace covers the waters off Hong Kong to the south, southeast and southwest. This does not include the airspace and immediate waters off the mainland China and Macau (under Guangzhou FIR). HK ACC does handle flight in and out of Macau International Airport.

Aerodrome classes
The HKG ACC assumes control of the following classes of airports
 VHHH – Chek Lap Kok
 VHSK – Sek Kong Airfield
 VHSS – Shun Tak Heliport
 HK07 – Central Government Heliport
 VMMC - Macau International Airport
 XZM - Macau Heliport
 RCLM - Dongsha Airport

References

External links
 HK CAA

Air traffic control centers
Aviation in Hong Kong
Air traffic control in Asia